Étienne Gajan (27 December 1890 – 14 January 1978) was a French athlete. He competed in the men's pole vault at the 1920 Summer Olympics.

References

External links 
 

1890 births
1978 deaths
Athletes (track and field) at the 1920 Summer Olympics
French male pole vaulters
Olympic athletes of France
Place of birth missing